André Hossein, born Aminulla Huseynov, also known as Aminollah Hossein (1905, in Samarkand – 9 August 1983, in Paris) was a French composer of Persian or Azerbaijani origin and a tar soloist. Hossein was the first Persian composer who was able to present his works in international concerts.

Life and education
His son, Robert Hossein, has written that André Hossein studied in Moscow, Russia and later in Germany where he attended a music academy in Stuttgart and the Berlin Conservatory from 1934 to 1937. His fascination with ancient Persia led him to convert to Zoroastrianism. His newfound religion immensely influenced his musical works such as "Persian Miniature", "I love my Country", and "Symphony Persepolis". He married  Anna Mincovschi, a Jewish comedy actress from Soroca (Bessarabia), who had immigrated to Paris with her parents after the October Revolution. He spent the rest of his life in France. He also studied privately under Paul Antoine Vidal in Conservatoire de Paris.

Works

In 1935 Hossein wrote his first ballet, Towards the Light. He also composed numerous pieces for the piano, including some études. Aminollah's love for his native Persia/Iran is evident in many of his works, especially The Symphony of Persepolis (also known as The Rubble of the Forgotten Empire), which he finished in 1947. Aminollah Hossein also made a symphony on Khayyám poems in 1951.

Other works by him include three piano concertos, Persian Miniature, Scheherezade (Shahrzad), and Arya Symphony. He also composed some film scores, including films directed by his son Robert Hossein, the Paris-born actor and director.

Various works by Hossein have been performed and recorded on LP discs by Orchestre du National de l'Opera de Paris (conducted by Jean-Claude Hartemann), Orchestre National de l'Opera de Monte-Carlo (conducted  by Pierre Dervaus) and Nuremberg Symphony Orchestra (conducted by Ali Rahbari) in the collection "Symphonic Poems from Persia", supported by the Ministry of Culture and Art in Tehran in late 1970s.

References

External links 
André Hossein article at Encyclopædia Iranica
Israeli pianist Pianist Amiram Rigai plays Aminollah Hossein's Persian Fable (audio)
Arya Symphony by A. Hossein (audio)
 Aminollah Hossein's memorial
 100th anniversary of Aminollah Hossein

1905 births
1983 deaths
People from Samarkand
People from Samarkand Oblast
Iranian classical musicians
Iranian composers
Iranian film score composers
Iranian tar players
White Russian emigrants to France
Converts to Zoroastrianism
French film score composers
French male film score composers
Iranian Zoroastrians
French people of Iranian descent
20th-century classical musicians
20th-century French composers
Emigrants from the Russian Empire to France
20th-century French male musicians